Blumeviridae is a family of RNA viruses, which infect prokaryotes.

Taxonomy 
Blumeviridae contains 31 genera:

 Alehndavirus 
 Bonghivirus 
 Cehntrovirus 
 Dahmuivirus
 Dehgumevirus 
 Dehkhevirus 
 Espurtavirus 
 Gifriavirus 
 Hehrovirus
 Ivolevirus
 Kahnayevirus 
 Kahraivirus
 Kemiovirus 
 Kerishovirus 
 Konmavirus
 Lirnavirus 
 Lonzbavirus
 Marskhivirus 
 Nehohpavirus 
 Nehpavirus 
 Obhoarovirus 
 Pacehavirus
 Pahdacivirus 
 Rhohmbavirus 
 Semodevirus
 Shihmovirus
 Shihwivirus
 Tibirnivirus
 Tinebovirus 
 Wahdswovirus 
 Yenihzavirus

References 

Virus families
Riboviria